Tomas Robert Olof Bolme (born 21 April 1945 in Högalid, Stockholm) is a Swedish actor. He is famous for being the Swedish voice of Tintin, and he is also the voice of the anime hero Cobra. As a child, he acted at Vår teater, a children's theatre in Stockholm. He studied at Teaterhögskolan in Stockholm during the years 1966 to 1969. Bolme has performed at Fria Proteatern, Royal Dramatic Theatre, Stockholm City Theatre and Riksteatern. He has also recorded several audiobooks and one of them is Jan Guillou's Coq Rouge.

Bolme is a former member of the political party Communist League Marxists-Leninists (KFML).

He is the brother of television host Agneta Bolme Börjefors. At the 24th Guldbagge Awards he won the award for Best Actor for his role in Creditors. Along with Kim Anderzon, he co-hosted the 27th Guldbagge Awards.

Selected filmography
 Pirates on the Malonen (1959)
 The Last Adventure (1974)
 Creditors (1988)

References

External links 
 
 

1945 births
Living people
Male actors from Stockholm
Swedish male stage actors
Swedish male voice actors
Swedish communists
Best Actor Guldbagge Award winners